During the 1994–95 season, SC Freiburg competed in the Bundesliga.

Season summary
The previous season, Freiburg had only avoided relegation on goal difference. This season, however, Freiburg finished third, 3 points off champions Borussia Dortmund, and above more favoured teams like Bayern Munich and Bayer Leverkusen. As a result, Freiburg qualified for European competition for the first time ever, entering the 1995–96 UEFA Cup.

Players

First-team squad

Competitions

Bundesliga

League table

Matches

DFB-Pokal

References

SC Freiburg seasons
SC Freiburg